Q78 may refer to:
 Q78 (New York City bus)
 An-Naba, a surah of the Quran